Dergano is a station on Line 3 of the Milan Metro which opened on March 26, 2011, twenty-one years after the opening of the original trunk of the line. It is the first station following Maciachini, the former northern terminus of the line. Dergano station was opened with other three stations, forming the branch from Dergano with Comasina.

The station is located on Via Carlo Imbonati, and is named after the Dergano district; it is not located in the square bearing the same name of the station.

The station is underground and has two platforms, one on each side of a double-track tunnel.

References

External links

Line 3 (Milan Metro) stations
Railway stations opened in 2011
2011 establishments in Italy
Railway stations in Italy opened in the 21st century